Highway 59 (MT 59) is a  state highway in Montana, United States, that connects Wyoming Highway 59 (WYO 59) in Wyoming with Montana Highway 200 (MT 200) near the south end of the town of Jordan. WYO 59 continues south  to the city of Gillette. The landscape traversed by MT 59 is mostly hilly and arid, largely used for open-range grazing; the only major commercial areas are the towns of Broadus and Miles City.

Route description
MT 59 continues as Fence Creek Road from the Wyoming state line across the desert for several miles before traveling concurrently with US 212 north. The highway enters the town of Broadus as Park Avenue heading north, and turns onto Holt Street, leaving town headed west. Passing by the Broadus Airport and the Rolling Hills Golf Course, MT 59 splits off from US 212 and continues northwest and then north through Olive and through meadows. Several miles later, MT 59 travels through Volborg before entering Miles City and has an interchange with Interstate 94 (I-94) on Haynes Avenue. The route turns west on Main Street, briefly traveling concurrently with I-94 Business (I-94 Bus.) before turning northwest on North 7th Street and crossing the Yellowstone River. MT 59 intersects Montana Secondary Highway 489 (S-489) across from the Miles City Airport before continuing through the plains of eastern Montana. The highway travels through Angela and Cohagen before ending at MT 200 in Jordan.

History

The current MT 59 is an amalgam of three roadway segments that were each formerly numbered separately. The highway south of Broadus was originally designated as S-319. From Broadus to Miles City, the highway was U.S. Route 312 (US 312) until 1981, and MT 59 north of Miles City was originally MT 22. Although US 312 continued west from Miles City to Billings, this was a concurrency with US 10, and only the part between Miles City and Broadus was independent. However, from 1959 to 1962, US 312 extended west to Yellowstone National Park, and its east end was at US 12 in Forsyth. In 1962, US 212, which had ended in Miles City, was rerouted to absorb former US 312 southwest of Billings, and US 312 was extended southeast to Broadus over former US 212.

Major intersections

See also

 List of state highways in Montana

References

External links

059
Transportation in Powder River County, Montana
Transportation in Custer County, Montana
Transportation in Rosebud County, Montana
Transportation in Garfield County, Montana